The 2012–13 Santos Laguna season was the 66th professional season of Mexico's top-flight football league. The season is split into two tournaments—the Torneo Apertura and the Torneo Clausura—each with identical formats and each contested by the same eighteen teams. Santos Laguna began their season on July 21, 2012 against San Luis, Santos Laguna played most their homes games on Saturdays at 7:00pm local time. Santos Laguna did not qualify to the final phase in the Apertura tournament and was eliminated in the semi-finals of the final phase by Cruz Azul in the Clausura tournament. Santos Laguna lost the 2012–13 CONCACAF Champions League final to Monterrey 4–2 on aggregate.

Torneo Apertura

Squad

Out on loan

Regular season

Apertura 2012 results

Goalscorers

Results

Results summary

Results by round

Torneo Clausura

Squad

Out on loan

Regular season

Clausura 2013 results

Final phase

Santos Laguna advanced 3–1 on aggregate

Cruz Azul advanced 5–1 on aggregate

Goalscorers

Regular season

Source:

Final phase

Results

Results summary

Results by round

CONCACAF Champions League

Group stage

Group 1

Championship Round 
Seeding was performed after the Group Stage. Santos was seed number two and faced Houston Dynamo the seventh seed in the quarterfinals. Santos won 3–1 on aggregate and advanced to the semis to face Seattle Sounders FC. Santos then advanced to the Finals defeating the Sounders 2–1 on aggregate. In the finals they will face their league rival Monterrey.

Quarterfinals

Semifinals

Finals

|}

Goalscorers

References

Mexican football clubs 2012–13 season